Henry Richard Van Dongen (August 20, 1920 - February 27, 2010) was an American artist who was known for his science fiction magazine and book covers.  He often alternated with Kelly Freas as the cover artist for Analog Science Fiction and Fact.  Van Dongen also worked for many Christian publications.

Van Dongen served as a B-24 gunner with the Eighth Air Force during World War II and spent 11 months as a prisoner of war after being shot down.

References

External links
 
 

1920 births
2010 deaths
American illustrators
American prisoners of war in World War II
American speculative fiction artists
Analog Science Fiction and Fact people
Fantasy artists
Science fiction artists
Shot-down aviators